The Southwest Division is one of the three divisions in the Western Conference of the National Basketball Association (NBA). Despite its name, the division is actually located in the South Central United States. The division consists of five teams, the Dallas Mavericks, the Houston Rockets, the Memphis Grizzlies, the New Orleans Pelicans and the San Antonio Spurs. Three of the teams, the Mavericks, Rockets, and Spurs, are based in Texas.

Consisting of some of the most historically competitive teams in the NBA's Western Conference, the division was created at the start of the 2004–05 season, when the league expanded from 29 to 30 teams with the addition of the Charlotte Bobcats. The league realigned itself into three divisions in each conference. The Southwest Division began with five inaugural members, the Mavericks, the Rockets, the Grizzlies, the Hornets (now Pelicans) and the Spurs. The Mavericks, the Rockets, the Grizzlies and the Spurs joined from the now-defunct Midwest Division, while the Pelicans joined from the Central Division.

The Spurs have been dominant since the division's inaugural season, having won the most Southwest Division titles with nine. The Rockets have won four, the Mavericks have won three, and the Pelicans and Grizzlies have each won one title. Four NBA champions came from the Southwest Division. The Spurs won the NBA championship in 2005, 2007 and 2014, while the Mavericks won in 2011. In the 2007–08 season, all four teams that qualified for the playoffs each had more than 50 wins. In the 2010–11 season and the 2014–15 season, all teams in the division had winning percentages above 0.500 (50%). In the 2014–15 season, the Southwest Division saw every one of its teams making the playoffs, a feat achieved only twice in the last 30 years. The most recent division champions are the Memphis Grizzlies.

Since the 2021–22 season, the Southwest Division champions has received the Willis Reed Trophy, named after Hall of Famer Willis Reed.

Current standings

Teams

Willis Reed Trophy
Beginning with the 2021–22 season, the Southwest Division champions has received the Willis Reed Trophy. As with the other division championship trophies, it is named after one of the African American pioneers from NBA history. During his playing career from 1964 to 1974, Willis Reed became the first HBCU graduate to win both the NBA MVP Award and the Finals MVP Award. The Reed Trophy consists of a  crystal ball.

Division champions

Division Titles by team

Season results

Rivalries

Houston Rockets vs. San Antonio Spurs

Notes
 The New Orleans Hornets temporarily relocated to Oklahoma City due to the effect of Hurricane Katrina. The majority of home games were played in Oklahoma City, while a few remained in New Orleans.
 Because of a lockout, the season did not start until December 25, 2011, and all 30 teams played a shortened 66-game regular season schedule.
 Due to the COVID-19 pandemic, the 82-game regular season schedule was cancelled on March 11, 2020. The season was restarted on July 30 under an eight-game seeding format in the 2020 NBA Bubble to conclude the regular season and determine playoff berths. Games were played inside the ESPN Wide World of Sports Complex at Walt Disney World in Orlando, Florida.
 Season shortened to 72 games due to COVID-19 pandemic.

References
General

Specific

External links
NBA.com Team Index

Western Conference (NBA)
National Basketball Association divisions
Dallas Mavericks
Houston Rockets
Memphis Grizzlies
New Orleans Pelicans
San Antonio Spurs
Sports in the Western United States
Sports in the Southern United States

he:מבנה ה-NBA#הבית הדרום מערבי